Sonic Flower Groove is the debut studio album by Scottish rock band Primal Scream, released on 5 October 1987 by Elevation Records. Mayo Thompson of Red Krayola was the producer of the album, after work with Stephen Street did not please the band. Musically, Sonic Flower Groove features psychedelic, Byrdsy jangle pop, being the only Primal Scream album to feature founding member Jim Beattie (credited as Jim Navajo).

The album sold well enough to reach number 62 on the UK Albums Chart, but performed poorly by major-label standards. The disappointment was a major reason for the original Primal Scream splitting up shortly after Sonic Flower Groove, leaving vocalist Bobby Gillespie and the guitar duo of Andrew Innes and Robert "Throb" Young to reorganize the band.

Critical reception

At the time of its release, critical reception was mixed. Underground called it "a real gem of a debut album" and "one that's sure to top all the polls come the end of the year", but others were less impressed. Melody Maker were impressed with "Gentle Tuesday" but said "the rest is not pop. It is dandelion fluff", stating that the album was "swamped with problems" with "no songs, just a dusty pile of dull leftovers".

A later Allmusic review called it "one goofy headscratcher of a release, the sound of a band that didn't quite know exactly what to do yet trying to record a big-budget (of sorts) debut album and ending up with little more than a pristine but dull photocopy of Turn! Turn! Turn!". In 2002, the Evening Times stated that it is "now regarded as a retro masterpiece".

Track listing

Personnel
Credits adapted from liner notes.
Primal Scream
 Bobby Gillespie – lead and backing vocals
 Jim Navajo – 12-string electric guitar
 Robert Young – bass guitar
 Andrew Innes – rhythm guitar
Additional personnel
 Dave Morgan – drums
 Gavin Skinner – drums
 Martin Duffy – piano
 Frank Sweeney – viola
Technical
 Pat Collier – engineering
Helen Backhouse - design
Andrew Catlin - cover photography

Charts

References

External links
 

1987 debut albums
Primal Scream albums
Albums produced by Mayo Thompson
Albums produced by Clive Langer
Jangle pop albums